Macrosiphoniella sibirica is an aphid found on stems and inflorescences of Artemisia (mugwort) in western Siberia and Kazakhstan. Named as a separate species by Ivanoskaya, it is very similar to M. artemisiae.

References

Bibliography

 Remaudière, G. & M. Remaudière (1997), Catalogue of the World’s Aphididae, INRA, Paris 473 pp.
 AphidSF: Aphid Species File. Favret C., 2010-04-14

Aphididae